Thomas Scott (born 17 July 2003) is an English professional footballer who plays as a central midfielder for Sunderland.

Professional career 
Scott came through the youth programme at Northampton Town, although he didn't make a first team appearance for the club. A free-kick goal by Scott was voted as the club's youth goal of the season in May 2021. Scott signed a professional contract with Sunderland in 2021 after impressing on trial. He joined the club's Under-23s, playing regularly in the Premier League 2.

Scott made his senior professional debut on 19 October 2021 in an EFL Trophy game against Manchester United U-23s.

References 

2003 births
Living people
English footballers
Sunderland A.F.C. players
Association football midfielders